Jiří Tožička  (November 14, 1901 – May 15, 1981) was a Czechoslovak ice hockey player who competed in the 1928 Winter Olympics and in the 1936 Winter Olympics.He was born in Prague. In 1928 he participated with the Czechoslovak team in the Olympic tournament.

Eight years later he was also a member of the Czechoslovak team which finished fourth in the 1936 Olympic tournament.

References

External links
 Olympic ice hockey tournaments 1928 and 1936  
 

1901 births
1981 deaths
HC Sparta Praha players
Ice hockey people from Prague
Czech ice hockey forwards
Czechoslovak ice hockey forwards
Czechoslovakia men's national ice hockey team coaches
Olympic ice hockey players of Czechoslovakia
Ice hockey players at the 1928 Winter Olympics
Ice hockey players at the 1936 Winter Olympics